The World Skateboarding Championship is an annual competition of men's and women's park skateboarding and street skateboarding, organized by World Skate (WS). Until 2017, the two disciplines were contested in separate tournaments, known as the Vans Park Series World Championship, for park skateboarding, and SLS Super Crown World Championship for street skateboarding.

Due to the 2022 Russian invasion of Ukraine, World Skate banned Russian and Belarusian athletes and officials from its competitions, and will not stage any events in Russia or Belarus in 2022. In 2022, World Skate organised the first vert world championship which was included as part of the 2022 World Skate Games.

Park skateboarding

Editions

Medalists

Men

Women

Street skateboarding

Editions

Medalists

Men

Women

Vert skateboarding

Editions

Medalists

Men

Women

Medal table

See also
Skateboarding at the Summer Olympics
X Games
Street League Skateboarding
Kimberley Diamond Cup

References

 
Skateboarding competitions
Skateboarding